The 1999 Western Michigan Broncos football team represented Western Michigan University in the Mid-American Conference (MAC) during the 1999 NCAA Division I-A football season.  In their third season under head coach Gary Darnell, the Broncos compiled a 7–5 record (6–2 against MAC opponents), finished in a tie for first place in the MAC's West Division, outscored their opponents, 373 to 342, and lost to Marshall in the MAC Football Championship Game.  The team played its home games at Waldo Stadium in Kalamazoo, Michigan.

The team's statistical leaders included Tim Lester with 3,639 passing yards, Robert Sanford with 1,137 rushing yards, and Steve Neal with 1,113 receiving yards.

Schedule

Roster

References

Western Michigan
Western Michigan Broncos football seasons
Western Michigan Broncos football